The Afrikan Alliance of Social Democrats (AASD) is a South African political party led by Pappie Mokoena, former African National Congress (ANC) mayor of Mangaung.

The party describes itself as "a modern Pan Afrikan Social democratic party that subscribes to the notion of a fair and just political order based on Effective Citizen Participatory Democracy", and aims to reconnect the community with the constitution and improve the quality of state services.

Mokoena was acquitted of theft and money-laundering charges in 2011, and reportedly heads Bloemfontein Correctional Contracts, a company running Mangaung prison, a facility accused of being “marred by irregularities and allegations of abuse and torture”.

The party contested the 2019 general election, failing to win a seat.

Election results

National Assembly

|-
! Election
! Total votes
! Share of vote
! Seats
! +/–
! Government
|-
! 2019
| 18,834
| 0.11
| 
| –
| 
|}

Provincial elections

! rowspan=2 | Election
! colspan=2 | Eastern Cape
! colspan=2 | Free State
! colspan=2 | Gauteng
! colspan=2 | Kwazulu-Natal
! colspan=2 | Limpopo
! colspan=2 | Mpumalanga
! colspan=2 | North-West
! colspan=2 | Northern Cape
! colspan=2 | Western Cape
|-
! % !! Seats
! % !! Seats
! % !! Seats
! % !! Seats
! % !! Seats
! % !! Seats
! % !! Seats
! % !! Seats
! % !! Seats
|-
! 2019
| - || -
| 0.19% || 0/30
| - || -
| - || -
| - || -
| - || -
| - || -
| 0.09% || 0/30
| - || -
|}

References

African National Congress breakaway groups
Nationalist parties in South Africa
Pan-Africanism in South Africa
Pan-Africanist political parties in Africa
Political parties in South Africa
Political parties with year of establishment missing
Social democratic parties in South Africa